Keef the Thief: A Boy and His Lockpick is a video game developed by Naughty Dog and published by Electronic Arts. It was released in 1989 for the Apple IIGS and then later ported to the Amiga and MS-DOS. Keef the Thief is a comedic sword and sorcery role-playing game.

Gameplay
The game is played in a first person perspective and uses a point and click interface. As the title character the player must steal as much as they can with the ultimate aim of accessing and looting the city treasury. As well as exploring the city the player can also visit other locales including dungeons, jungles and an arena. The gameplay is similar to other RPGs of the era.

Development 
In the 1980s Naughty Dog became the youngest third party studio to contract with Electronic Arts. The contract was agreed after the developers had cold called Electronic Arts' helpline and ended up speaking to a producer. The developers acted like "wild, loud kids" at the hotel where EA held its developer's conferences.

Naughty Dog recalled: "While we were making it, Andy entered sarcastic text as a place holder for what we believed would be the real text in the final release. EA liked the humor so much that they decided to make the entire game a comedy." The consequence of this humor on the sales was "no joke", however.

Reception
The Amiga and Apple IIGS versions of the game were reviewed in 1990 in Dragon #157 by Hartley, Patricia, and Kirk Lesser in "The Role of Computers" column. The reviewers normally gave a game a rating from 1 to 5 stars, but they gave the Apple II version of this game an "X" for "Not recommended" because of its antiquated copy-protection system.

Reviews
Amiga Format - Jan, 1990
Commodore User - Dec, 1989
Amiga Action - Jan, 1991
Aktueller Software Markt - Jan, 1990
Aktueller Software Markt - Dec, 1989

References

External links

Review in Info

1989 video games
Adventure games
Amiga games
Apple IIGS games
DOS games
Electronic Arts games
Fantasy video games
Fictional professional thieves
Naughty Dog games
Role-playing video games
Video games developed in the United States